The Central District of Amlash County is a district (bakhsh) in Amlash County, Gilan Province, Iran. At the 2006 census, its population was 29,716, in 8,603 families.  The District has one city: Amlash. The District has two rural districts (dehestan): Amlash-e Jonubi Rural District and Amlash-e Shomali Rural District.

References 

Amlash County
Districts of Gilan Province